Ball Creek is a stream in the U.S. state of Georgia. It is a tributary to Talking Rock Creek.

Ball Creek was named for the indigenous North American stickball once played in the area by Indians.

References

Rivers of Georgia (U.S. state)
Rivers of Gilmer County, Georgia
Rivers of Pickens County, Georgia